The Deputy Prime Minister of Syria (Arabic: نائب رئيس الوزراء السوري) is the deputy to the Prime Minister of Syria, who is head of the government of Syria, and a member of the Council of Ministers. The deputy prime minister is the second highest ranking member of the Council of Ministers. In the semi-presidential system of government, the prime minister is treated as the "first among equals" in the cabinet; the position of deputy prime minister is used to bring political stability and strength within a government or in times of national emergency, when a proper chain of command is necessary.

List of deputy prime ministers 

 Ali Abdullah Ayyoub
 Adil Arslan
 Bashir al-Azma

 Rashad Barmada

 Abdullah Dardari

 Lutfi al-Haffar
 Mohammad al-Hussein

 Abdul Halim Khaddam
 Qadri Jamil

 Walid Muallem
 Abd al-Qadir Qaddura

 Khalid Raad

 Farouk al-Sharaa

 Mustafa Tlass

 Salim Yasin

References

See also 

 Prime Minister of Syria
 Council of Ministers (Syria)

Cabinet of Syria
Government ministers of Syria
Deputy prime ministers